The 1982 NSW Building Society Open was a women's tennis tournament played on outdoor grass courts at the White City Stadium in Sydney, Australia that was part of the 1982 Avon Championships World Championship Series. It was the 91st edition of the tournament and was held from 22 November through 28 November 1982. First-seeded Navratilova won the singles title and earned $22,000 first-prize money.

Finals

Singles
 Martina Navratilova defeated  Evonne Goolagong Cawley 6–0, 3–6, 6–1
 It was Navratilova's 14th singles title of the year and the 69th of her career.

Doubles
 Martina Navratilova /  Pam Shriver defeated  Eva Pfaff /  Claudia Kohde-Kilsch 6–2, 2–6, 7–6
 It was Navratilova's 12th doubles title of the year and the 77th of her career. It was Shriver's 11th doubles title of the year and the 29th of her career.

References

External links
 ITF tournament edition details
 Tournament draws

NSW Building Society Open
Sydney International
NSW Building Society Open
NSW Building Society Open
NSW Building Society Open, 1982